Blastobasis litis is a moth in the  family Blastobasidae. It is found in Costa Rica.

The length of the forewings is 5–6 mm. The forewings are greyish brown intermixed with greyish-brown scales tipped with pale greyish brown. The hindwings are translucent greyish brown, gradually darkening towards the apex.

Etymology
The specific epithet is derived from Latin litis (meaning a legal controversy or action).

References

Moths described in 2013
Blastobasis